Kingdom of Crooked Mirrors (translit. Korolevstvo krivykh zerkal) is a 2007 Russian fairy tale musical film directed by Alexander Igudin based on the novel Kingdom of Crooked Mirrors by Vitali Gubarev. It was different and adapted from the 1963 film, Kingdom of Crooked Mirrors. Junior Eurovision winners Masha and Nastya Tolmachevy starred in this version.

References

External links
Kingdom of Crooked Mirrors at the KinoPoisk

2007 television films
2007 films
2000s Russian-language films
Russian television films
Russian musical films
Russia-1 original programming